Rush is an Australian television series produced by the Australian Broadcasting Corporation between 1974 and 1976. The first 13 episodes were produced in 1974 and filmed in black and white. In 1976, 13 more episodes were produced, in colour, in conjunction with French public broadcaster Antenne 2. Each series featured a different cast with the exception of John Waters.

Story and characters 

Rush was a historical drama set during the Victorian Gold Rush during the 1850s. The first series was set at "Crocker's Gully", a fictitious goldfield created for the series at the foothills of the Dandenongs, near Melbourne. The village of tents and timbered huts was modelled on the lithographs of Samuel Thomas Gill, an artist who portrayed life on the Victorian goldfields during the 1850s.

The story revolves mainly round Edmond Fitzalan (played by Brendon Lunney), a young and inexperienced Gold Commissioner who is stationed at Crocker's Gully. The Gold Commission Service was formed to maintain law and order and to deal with licensing fees on the goldfields.

The main cast the first year featured Waters, Olivia Hamnett, Brendon Lunney, Alwyn Kurts, Peter Flett, Max Meldrum.

The sequel in 1976 had the setting relocated to New South Wales, with the action occurring nine years later (1860) than the first series. It was set in Turon Springs (formerly Wheogo), but shot near Belrose outside Sydney utilising sets left over from a previous historical drama about Ben Hall. John Waters, playing the part of Sgt Mackellar, co-starred with French actor Alain Doutey as Constable Emile Bizard. Other stars included: Jane Harders, Delore Whitman, and Vincent Ball. Hugh Keays-Byrne won a Logie Award for his performance in one episode of the second series. David Gulpilil was a guest actor when an aboriginal character was in the script. Unfortunately the role only called for a stereotyped portrayal.

The bulk of the scripts for the series were written by Colin Free and Ted Roberts.

The series began with a blockbuster of film length, followed by 50-minute episodes. It began screening on ABC-TV on 20 August 1974 in Victoria, and later in other States.

Theme music and commercial releases 

The theme to the series, was released as a hit single in Australia by Brian May and the ABC Showband (b/w The Theme from Seven Little Australians) on the Image record label in 1974. The composer of the score was George Dreyfus, whilst Brian May was responsible for the arrangement. The single made number 5 in the Australian national singles chart in December 1974. The opening sequence of the theme has some concurrence with British folk song Ten Thousand Miles Away

The original television series has not been commercially released, because the talent was contracted for broadcast rights only.

Later parody 

A recurring segment in the first season of the ABC comedy program The Late Show (1992) was a parody-overdub of Rush titled The Olden Days. The segments consisted of re-edited and re-voiced black & white clips from the first season of Rush. Brendon Lunney's character was renamed "Governor Frontbottom" and voiced by Tony Martin; John Waters' character was renamed "Sgt. Olden" and voiced by Mick Molloy; Alwyn Kurts' character was renamed "Judge Muttonchops" and voiced by Martin; and the setting was changed to "the Victorian Mud Fields." In the Late Show episode which featured the final segment of The Olden Days, Lunney and Waters appeared as surprise guests (humorously dubbing their voices over Tony Martin and Mick Molloy, before appearing in person live on stage).

The collected segments were later released on VHS tape as The Late Show Presents The Olden Days. In 2007, The Olden Days (along with Bargearse, a parody-overdub of the 1970s TV show Bluey) were released on DVD. On the commentary track Santo Cilauro revealed they discovered a missing episode, mislabeled in a film can.

See also 

 List of Australian television series

References

External links 

 
 Rush at Classic Australian Television
 Rush at the National Film and Sound Archive (documentation and soundtrack)
 Newspaper clippings about Rush on a John Waters fan site

1974 Australian television series debuts
1976 Australian television series endings
Australian Broadcasting Corporation original programming
1970s Australian drama television series
Television series set in the 1850s
Television shows set in Victoria (Australia)
Television shows set in colonial Australia
Black-and-white Australian television shows
Australian Western (genre) films